These are the official results of the Men's 5000 metres event at the 2003 IAAF World Championships in Paris, France. There were a total number of 29 participating athletes, with two qualifying heats and the final held on Sunday 31 August 2003 at 18:40h.

This race had the 1500 meter champion/world record holder, Hicham El Guerrouj and the 10,000 meter champion Kenenisa Bekele.  This was considered a meeting ground half way.  From the start, Bekele took the race out to let his endurance burn off the faster opponent.  El Guerrouj immediately marked his move.  Also along for the ride were two more Ethiopians and a pack of four Kenyans, including defending champion Richard Limo.  While the group broke away from the field, the fast early pace slowed.  With two laps to go, it was El Guerrouj who took out the lead.  The next lap burnt off a couple of Ethiopians but the Kenyans were all there with Bekele, still in contact with El Guerrouj.  As the final lap quickened, world junior record holder, eighteen year old Eliud Kipchoge rode on El Guerrouj's shoulder, with Bekele chasing in third.  El Guerrouj opened up a gap of 3 metres down the back stretch, with Bekele gaining on Kipchoge, the rest of the Kenyan team strung out behind.  Challenged by Bekele, Kipchoge accelerated through the turn, moving up to El Guerrouj's shoulder.  With Bekele moving onto Kipchoge's shoulder, it was three abreast coming off the turn and John Kibowen tailing closely behind.  El Guerrouj accelerated again but Kipchoge didn't go away. On the outside Bekele made up some ground, the three separated by a metre.  But El Guerrouj and Kipchoge were dead even.  As Bekele couldn't make up any more ground, Kipchoge gained a few inches on El Guerrouj.  Over the last few steps, El Guerrouj struggled and lost his form, trying to make a desperate dive at the line, but it was too little too late.  The final lap was 53 seconds.

By this point in time, none of the three medalists had achieved an Olympic Gold Medal, though ultimately all three would.  The same three would match up the following year in the 2004 Olympics with El Guerrouj taking gold.

Final

Heats
Held on Thursday 28 August 2003

See also
Athletics at the 2003 Pan American Games - Men's 5000 metres

References
 

H
5000 metres at the World Athletics Championships